India competed at the 1999 South Asian Games held in Kathmandu, Nepal. In this edition of the South Asian Games, India ranked 1st with 102 gold medals and 197 in total.

1999
1999 South Asian Games
1999 in Indian sport